Claraia is an extinct genus of scallop-like bivalve molluscs that lived from the Capitanian stage of the Late Permian to the Anisian stage of the Middle Triassic, 266-237 million years ago. Fossils have been found worldwide in North America, Europe, Asia, Africa, and Australia. These are common fossils subsequent to the Permian-Triassic boundary, suggesting that the genus experienced rapid diversification during and after the Permian–Triassic extinction event, around 251.4 million years ago.

Ecology
Claraia may have been an opportunistic genus that filled the niche of many benthic invertebrates such as brachiopods that were heavily impacted by the extinction. A narrowing of the byssal notch and a trend towards a smoother shell in species of Claraia over time may have led to increased mobility. This increase in mobility may have been an advantage over more sessile animals during the extinction event. It is thought to have lived in anoxic waters at great depths, and therefore may have been better adapted for the anoxic event that may have occurred during the Permian–Triassic extinction event.

References

External links
 Claraia at The Paleobiology Database

Pectinida
Prehistoric bivalve genera
Permian bivalves
Triassic bivalves
Permian animals of Africa
Permian animals of Asia
Permian animals of Oceania
Permian animals of Europe
Permian animals of North America
Triassic animals of Africa
Triassic animals of Asia
Triassic animals of Oceania
Triassic animals of Europe
Triassic animals of North America
Capitanian genus first appearances
Wuchiapingian genera
Changhsingian genera
Induan genera
Olenekian genera
Anisian genus extinctions
Anisian life